Villanova Marchesana is a comune (municipality) in the Province of Rovigo in the Italian region Veneto, located about  southwest of Venice and about  southeast of Rovigo.

The municipality of Villanova Marchesana contains the frazioni (subdivisions, mainly villages and hamlets) Ca' de Rusco, Canalazzo, Canalnuovo, Capo di Sopra, Cisimatti, and Ponte.

Villanova Marchesana borders the following municipalities: Adria, Berra, Crespino, Gavello, Papozze.

Demographic evolution

References

External links 

Cities and towns in Veneto